Railway Air Services (RAS) was a British airline formed in March 1934 by the Big Four railway companies (the GWR, LMS, LNER and SR) and Imperial Airways. The airline was a domestic airline operating routes within the United Kingdom linking up with Imperial's services.

Prewar routes

The airline's main operating and maintenance base was at London's Croydon Airport pre- and post-war, and at Liverpool Airport during World War II.

The most important RAS route flown was between London and Scotland (London-Birmingham-Manchester/Liverpool-Belfast-Glasgow). The trunk service commenced on 20 August 1934, using the airline's newly delivered DH.86 Express biplane airliners, which operated once daily in each direction. The service was mainly aimed at passengers wishing to connect at Croydon Airport with IALs flights to the Continent. RAS were unhappy with winter operations at Manchester's small airfield at Barton Aerodrome and the flights switched to the larger Liverpool (Speke) from the late October, resuming through Barton on 15 April 1935.

Routes operated from Cardiff Municipal Airport included Cardiff to Plymouth and Cardiff to Liverpool and commenced in 1934.

World War II

In 1939, the operation of civil aircraft was restricted and part of the RAS fleet was placed under government control. The aircraft were involved in communications flights for the military within the British Isles. By 1940, the Royal Air Force had taken over all the military communications tasks and the airline returned to flying routes 'of national importance'. In practice, wartime operations were restricted to the Liverpool-Belfast-Glasgow route carrying government and other 'priority' passengers and mail.

Postwar operations

Railway Air Services resumed peacetime flights in early 1946, now also using their newly acquired Avro Ansons and ex-RAF Douglas DC-3 Dakotas. A number of ex Luftwaffe Junkers Ju 52 trimotor aircraft were used during 1946/47 before retirement and scrapping.

The airline operated its Dakotas, with their higher passenger carrying capacity, on their non-stop flights from Croydon to Glasgow (Renfrew) Airport.

A new twice-daily RAS scheduled service commenced on 29 July 1946, using the Avro Ansons, which linked linking Croydon with Manchester Ringway and Belfast (Nutts Corner) Airport.

Nationalisation

In August 1946, the UK government formed the British European Airways Corporation (BEA) a state-owned airline. The airline was given a monopoly of scheduled air services within the United Kingdom and to continental Europe. From 1 August 1946 RAS operated all its services on behalf of BEA until it ceased operations on 31 January 1947 with BEA acquiring the RAS aircraft, staff and routes. A memory does live on however. DH.89A Dragon Rapide G-ALXT is preserved by the Science Museum in RAS colour scheme and named 'Star of Scotia'. It is currently in storage at Wroughton.

Accidents and incidents

 On 1 July 1935, de Havilland Dragon G-ADED crashed on take-off from Ronaldsway Airport, Isle of Man injuring all seven people on board. The aircraft, which was operating a scheduled passenger flight from Ronaldsway to Ringway Airport, Manchester via Squires Gate Airport, Blackpool and Speke Airport, Liverpool was destroyed in the subsequent fire.
 On 26 October 1935, DH.84 Dragon 2 G-ADEE, crashed on hillside in fog and burnt out, Fairsnape Fell, near Garstang, Lancs. Fg Off Cedric Rex Crow (25) killed (RAFO) Ronald Swales (24) killed.
 On 6 June 1936, DH. 89 Dragon Rapide "Star of Lancashire", following a forced landing, on Deane golf course, Bolton, Lancashire, the aircraft ran through a fence, destroying the port wings, engine nacelle and landing gear. The pilot and the three passengers were unhurt. 
 On 3 July 1938, DH.89A Dragon Rapide G-AEBX "Star of Scotia", spun and crashed in circuit, Belfast Harbour Airport, Sydenham, Capt Alfred Churchill Larmuth (31) killed (Fg Off, RAFO), Reginald H Vaughan (23) killed (engineer)
 On 1 April 1946, DH.89 Dragon Rapide G-AERZ, Belfast-City, Antrim, 6 killed.
 On 16 August 1946, Avro 19 G-AGUE, Speke, Liverpool, no fatalities.
 On 27 September 1946, De Havilland DH.89 Dragon Rapide G-AFFF, Milngavie, Dunbartonshire, 7 killed.
 On 19 December 1946, Converted Douglas C-47 Skytrain (DC3) G-AGZA, taking off from Northolt crashed into a house in Angus Drive, Ruislip, with no serious injuries to anyone, either in the aircraft or on the ground.

Fleet
 Avro XIX (1945-1947)
 de Havilland Dragon  (1934-1939)
 de Havilland Express (1934-1947)
 de Havilland Dragon Rapide (1935-1947)
 Douglas Dakota (1946-1947)
 Junkers Ju 52/3m (1946-1947)

See also
 List of defunct airlines of the United Kingdom

References
 Notes

Bibliography

External links
, contemporary description of the Railway Air Services

Airlines established in 1934
Airlines disestablished in 1947
Defunct airlines of the United Kingdom
Great Western Railway
Imperial Airways
London and North Eastern Railway
London, Midland and Scottish Railway
Southern Railway (UK)
1934 establishments in the United Kingdom
1947 disestablishments in the United Kingdom